Harriet Nahanee also known as  Tseybayotl-t  (December 7, 1935 – February 24, 2007) was an indigenous rights activist, residential school alumna, and environmental activist.  She was born in British Columbia, Canada.  She comes from the Pacheedaht who are part of the Nuu-chah-nulth, Indigenous peoples from the Vancouver Island. As a child, Nahanee attended both Ahousaht Residential School and Alberni Residential School, and would later testify about the horrible treatment she received there. She married into the Squamish (Sḵwxwú7mesh).

Harriet  was sentenced to two weeks in a provincial jail in January 2007  for criminal contempt of court for her part in the Sea-to-Sky Highway expansion protest at Eagleridge Bluffs. She was then hospitalized with pneumonia a week after her release from the jail, at which time doctors discovered she had lung cancer. She died of pneumonia and complications at St. Paul's Hospital in Vancouver on February 24, 2007, one month after her original sentencing.

Nahanee had been weak from the flu and asthma in January, and it was widely suspected that Nahanee's condition worsened during her incarceration at the Surrey Pre-Trial Centre. An independent public inquiry into her death was called for in the Legislative Assembly of British Columbia on March 5. Solicitor-General John Les said the provincial government expressed regret for the passing but denied any government responsibility and refused opposition requests for an inquiry.

Quotes

See also 

 Notable Aboriginal people of Canada
 Squamish people
 Nuu-chah-nulth
 Residential School

References

External links
 In the Spirit of Warrior Harriet Nahanee Weblog – Weblog created on updates following Harriet's previous work, and the case following her death.

1935 births
2007 deaths
Squamish people (individuals)
Canadian environmentalists
Canadian women environmentalists
Anti-corporate activists
First Nations activists
Indigenous leaders in British Columbia
Women in British Columbia politics
Nuu-chah-nulth people
First Nations women in politics
Deaths from pneumonia in British Columbia
20th-century First Nations people
21st-century First Nations people